Reddy/Reddi is an Indian surname. In India it is predominantly used by members of the Telugu speaking Reddy caste. It is also used as a surname by members of the Reddi Lingayat and Reddy Vokkaliga communities of Karnataka.

Awardees

Padma Vibhushan
 Prathap C. Reddy (2010)
 Ravi Narayan Reddy (1992)
 Y. V. Reddy (2010)

Padma Bhushan

 B. Narasimha Reddy (1974)
 Muthulakshmi Reddi (1956)
 Perugu Siva Reddy, eye specialist
 Raj Reddy (2001), computer scientist
 C. Narayana Reddy (1992)

Padma Shri
 A. Sankara Reddy (2009)
 Enuga Sreenivasulu Reddy (2000)
 T. Venkatapathi Reddiar (2012)

Politicians 
 Alimineti Madhava Reddy - home minister
 Anantha Venkatarami Reddy (born 1956) - Member of Parliament, Indian National Congress, Anantapur
 B. Satya Narayan Reddy - Governor of Odisha, West Bengal, Uttar Pradesh
 B. V. Subba Reddy, politician
 Bezawada Gopala Reddy, Chief Minister of Andhra state, governor of Uttar Pradesh
 Bezawada Ramachandra Reddy - politician and one of the founders of the Swatantra Party
 Bhavanam Venkatarami Reddy - former chief minister of Andhra Pradesh
 G. Janardhana Reddy, leader of the BSR Congress party
 Gujjula Ravindra Reddy - mayor of Altlandsberg, Germany, Member of State Parliament of Brandenburg, Germany
 Jaipal Reddy - Cabinet Minister for Petroleum, member of the Lok Sabha
 K. Chengalaraya Reddy, first Chief Minister of Karnataka
 K. R. Suresh Reddy, former speaker
 K. V. Raghunatha Reddy governor of West Bengal, Odisha, Tripura
 Kasu Brahmananda Reddy, Chief Minister of Andhra Pradesh, home minister of India, central finance minister
 Komatireddy Venkat Reddy - Congress minister, deputy floor leader
 Kotla Vijaya Bhaskara Reddy, former Chief Minister of Andhra Pradesh
 Kunduru Jana Reddy - Telangana congress (leader of opposition)
 Mahendra Reddy - Member of the Parliament and Minister in Fiji
 Marri Chenna Reddy, Chief Minister of Andhra Pradesh, governor of Uttar Pradesh, Rajasthan, Punjab, Tamil Nadu
 Marri Shashidhar Reddy - Member of the Legislative Assembly representing the Sanathnagar constituency in Andhra Pradesh, Member of National Disaster Management Authority
 N. Janardhana Reddy - chief minister of Andhra Pradesh
 Nalamada Uttam Kumar Reddy - Telangana congress pcc chief
 Nallari Kiran Kumar Reddy - former chief minister of Andhra Pradesh, Indian National Congress, Pileru, Chittoor
 Neelam Sanjiva Reddy, President of India, first Chief Minister of Andhra Pradesh, Speaker of Lok Sabha
 Nimma Raja Reddy - former minister of Andhra Pradesh
 P. Mahender Reddy – transport minister Telangana
 Revanth Reddy - congress leader
 S. Raja Reddy, Communist Party of India MLA in Tamil Nadu
 Sanigaram Santosh Reddy - Minister of Roads & Buildings & Finance, Armoor, Nizamabad
 Suravaram Sudhakar Reddy - Member of Parliament, Political Leader, Communist party, Nalgonda
 T. Jeevan Reddy - congress minister
 Y. S. Jaganmohan Reddy, Chief Minister of Andhra Pradesh
 Y. S. Rajasekhara Reddy, Chief Minister of Andhra Pradesh

Leaders, activists, reformers and philanthropists
 Arutla Ramchandra Reddy - Indian freedom fighter and Telangana movement leader
 Bhimreddy Narasimha Reddy - a leader of the Telangana Rebellion
 Chandra Pulla Reddy - Indian communist leader
 Gona Ganna Reddy - ruler of the Vaddemani Kingdom
 Raja Bahadur Venkatarama Reddy (1869-1953) - Kotwal of Hyderabad, founder of Reddy Hostel
 T. Nagi Reddy (1917-1976) - Communist politician from Andhra Pradesh, India
 Uyyalawada Narasimha Reddy - led the first popular revolt against British occupation in 1847

Poets and writers
 Apsara Reddy — journalist
 Gona Budda Reddy - 13th-century poet
 Gunapati Keshavaa Reddy (G. K. Reddy)(1923-1987) - journalist and chief of bureau of The Hindu
 Keshava Reddy – Telugu novelist
 Kethu Viswanatha Reddy (born 1939) - poet from Rayalaseema
 M. S. Reddy - poet, producer, director, philanthropist
 Suravaram Pratapareddy (1896–1953), social historian from Hyderabad State
 Vemana - Also known as Yogi Vemana or Kumaragiri Vema Reddy, 14th-century Telugu poet

Film industry
A. Kodandarami Reddy, director
B. Nagi Reddy, producer, Dadasaheb Phalke awardee 
B. V. Nandini Reddy, director
Bharath Reddy (actor), actor
B. N. Reddy, director, first Dadasaheb Phalke Award recipient from South India
H. M. Reddy, producer, director of first South Indian talkie movie 
Keerthi Reddy, actress
M. Prabhakar Reddy, actor
Pattabhirama Reddy Tikkavarapu, producer and director
Raam Reddy, director
Ramana Reddy, actor and comedian
Rami Reddy (actor), actor
S. Gopala Reddy, cinematographer
S. V. Krishna Reddy, director, musician
Sameera Reddy (born 1980), Indian film actress
Siva Reddy, actor, mimicry
Sriya Reddy (born 1983), Telugu and Tamil film actor
Surender Reddy, director
Swathi Reddy, actress
V. N. Reddy
Vishal Krishna Reddy, actor
Vaibhav Reddy, actor

Education
 Amulya Kumar N Reddy - Chairman of Department of Management Studies in Indian Institute of Science and awardee of Volvo Environment Prize
 Arjula Ramachandra Reddy - biologist, first vice-chancellor of Yogi Vemana University
 Cattamanchi Ramalinga Reddy, founder and vice-chancellor of Andhra University; Vice-chancellor of Mysore University
 G. Ram Reddy - former University Grants Commission chairman
 Daya Reddy - South African scientist and Acting Vice Chancellor at the University of Cape Town

Other
 B. V. R. Mohan Reddy, businessman
 D. Nageshwar Reddy, gastroenterologist
 G. Pulla Reddy, businessman, philanthropist
 G. Raghava Reddy - IPS, known for innovative farming
 Gayatri Reddy, Indian anthropologist
 Gunupati Venkata Krishna Reddy, businessman
 K. Srinath Reddy, physician
 Kallam Anji Reddy, businessman
 Krishna Reddy (artist), printmaker and sculptor
 Laxman Reddy - bodybuilder, Mr. World 2010
 Malla Reddy, educationist, politician
 P Obul Reddy, entrepreneur, industrialist, philanthropist
 Perugu Siva Reddy, eye surgeon
 Prathap C. Reddy, businessman
 Prem Reddy, businessman
 Raj Reddy, scientist
 Raja and Radha Reddy - Kuchipudi
 S. P. Y. Reddy - chairman of Nandi Pipes, Panyam Cements and S.P.Y. Agro Industries
 Solipuram Madhusudhan Reddy (born 1940), Indian botanist with the standard author abbreviation S.M. Reddy
 T Venkattram Reddy, businessman
 T. Subbarami Reddy, businessman, politician, philanthropist
 Umesh Reddy, serial killer and rapist from India
 Y. Venugopal Reddy, Reserve Bank Governor
 Yamini Reddy - Kuchipudi

Singers
 S. V. Krishna Reddy,  Indian music composer and singer

Sports
 Bharath Reddy, Indian cricketer
 Harishankar Reddy, Indian cricketer
 Neelapu Rami Reddy - sprinter and athletics champion

See also
 Reddy (disambiguation)
 Ready (surname)

References

Reddy